Francis Stacker Dutton CMG (18 October 1818 – 25 January 1877) was the seventh Premier of South Australia, serving twice, firstly in 1863 and again in 1865.

History
Dutton was born at Cuxhaven, Germany, where his father was British vice-consul, in 1818. He was educated at Hofwyl College, near Bern in Switzerland, and afterwards at the high school at Bremen in Germany. At 17, he went to Brazil as a junior clerk and was there for about five years, in Bahia and Rio de Janeiro.

In 1839, he joined his older brothers Hampden, Pelham and Frederick in Sydney, went overland to Melbourne, and followed mercantile pursuits for about 18 months, He then joined his brother Frederick at Adelaide and in 1842 or early in 1843, discovered copper at Kapunda, 45 miles north of Adelaide. He showed the specimen he had found to Captain Charles Bagot, who produced a similar specimen that his son had found in the same locality. The land was purchased and samples were sent to England, which showed a high percentage of copper. Dutton visited England in 1845 and sold his interest in the mine for a large sum. While in London, he prepared for publication his South Australia and its Mines, a work of 360 pages, a valuable contemporary account of the new colony published in 1846.

Dutton returned to South Australia in 1847 and in 1849, became a member of the Adelaide board of city commissioners. In 1850 Dutton wrote 'Constitution fuer Suedaustralien: Gesetz zur bessern Regierung der australischen Colonien Ihrer Majestaet' (In English: Constitution for South Australia: Act for the better government of Her Majesty's Australian Colonies) to bring discussions on the formation of a constitution in South Australia to the attention of German settlers.

He was elected a member of the Legislative Council for East Adelaide in 1851 and sat until 1857, when he was elected to the House of Assembly as member for City of Adelaide (9 March 1857 to 18 March 1860) and then for Light (19 March 1860 to 22 Apr 1862; and 17 November 1862 to 28 September 1865). He was Commissioner of Crown Lands and Immigration in the Hanson government from 30 September 1857 to 2 June 1859, and was premier from 4 to 15 July 1863. He formed his second cabinet on 22 March 1865 and was premier and commissioner of public works until 20 September of the same year, when he became agent-general in London for South Australia. He was a good linguist, able to speak French, German and Portuguese, and had an excellent knowledge of business which enabled him to carry out his duties with success until his death on 25 January 1877.

Recognition
Dutton was made a Commander of the Order of St Michael and St George (CMG) in 1872. He was also a Fellow of the Geographical Society, Associate of the Institute of Civil Engineers, and a Member of both the Royal Institution of Great Britain and Colonial Institute.

Dutton's Bluff, later Dutton Bluff, a hill some 66 km north-west of Quorn, was named for him and the Victorian government botanist named Eremophila duttonii in his honour.

Family
Dutton married Caroline MacDermott (ca.1822 – 1 June 1855), a daughter of Marshall MacDermott on 7 November 1849; they had two sons and a daughter: 
Francis "Frank" MacDermott Dutton (1850 – c. 9 May 1932)
Caroline Birch Dutton (15 August 1852 – 1950) married barrister Charles Thomas Mitchell in Norland, Middlesex on 17 August 1878. Her portrait was painted by Carlile Henry Hayes Macartney
Sir Frederick Dutton (14 April 1855 – c. 10 October 1930), solicitor of Wilkins, Blyth, Dutton and Hartley, married Beatrice Aimee Bridger MBE (1863 – 1 August 1928) in 1883.

William Hampden Dutton (1805–1849), pastoralist of Anlaby Station and miner at Kapunda, was a brother, as was pastoralist and parliamentarian Frederick Hansborough Dutton (1812–1890).

Note: William Dutton (1811–1878), sometimes referred to as "William Pelham Dutton", ship's captain, whaler and pioneer of Portland, Victoria, was not closely related. Author Geoffrey Dutton, great-grandson of W. H. Dutton, warned against this confusion in his article on F. S. Dutton in the Australian Dictionary of Biography. For his relationship to other people prominent in the history of South Australia see separate article.

References

Sources
Parliament of South Australia - Dutton
South Australian Register and South Australian Advertiser, 29 January 1877.
F. Dutton (1846), South Australia and its Mines, London: T. and W. Boone.

 

|-

|-

|-

|-

|-

|-

|-

|-

Premiers of South Australia
Companions of the Order of St Michael and St George
1818 births
1877 deaths
19th-century Australian politicians
Members of the South Australian House of Assembly
Members of the South Australian Legislative Council